Unlikely Revolutionaries is a 2010 Italian crime-comedy film directed by Lucio Pellegrini. It was shot between Rome and in Cervinia, Aosta Valley.  The film was screened out of competition at the 2011 Montreal World Film Festival.

Plot    
A "chronic" precarious worker, a port from Marghera, a somewhat seasoned university researcher, an insecure television journalist and a man just out of jail, disappointed by their life, decide to take action and kidnap a minister.

Cast 
 Pierfrancesco Favino as Pepe
 Giuseppe Battiston as Bauer
 Fabio Volo as Toni
 Claudia Pandolfi as Marilù
 Giorgio Tirabassi as Stella
 Simona Nasi as Silvia, Stella's wife
 Fausto Maria Sciarappa as Umberto
 Paolo Sassanelli as Ramon
 Camilla Filippi as Marta
 Lydia Biondi as Pepe's Mother
 Edoardo Gabbriellini as Edo

See also    
 List of Italian films of 2010

References

External links

2010 films
2010s crime comedy films
Italian crime comedy films
Films directed by Lucio Pellegrini
2010 comedy films
2010s Italian films